Love, Linda: The Life Of Mrs. Cole Porter is a theatrical and musical adventure about the life of Linda Lee Thomas, the socialite wife of composer Cole Porter, with a Book by Stevie Holland with Gary William Friedman, Music and Lyrics by Cole Porter, and Arrangements and Additional Music by Gary William Friedman. It originally starred Stevie Holland. It opened at the Triad Theater on October 28, 2009 for an initial limited run through November 21, 2009, and returned for a brief run in 2010, closing on June 9, 2010, before touring regionally. The show had its Off-Broadway premiere, with direction by Richard Maltby, Jr., in a limited engagement at the York Theatre, beginning December 3, 2013, and closing January 5th, 2014.

 A film of the stage version starring Stevie Holland was released in 2021.
>

See also
Love, Linda: The Life of Mrs. Cole Porter (Original Cast Album)

References

External links
 
 
 

2009 musicals
Biographical musicals
Off-Broadway musicals
Plays for one performer
Cultural depictions of American women
Cultural depictions of Cole Porter